The Leterme I Government was the federal government of Belgium from 20 March 2008 to 22 December 2008. It took office when the Flemish Christian democrat Yves Leterme (CD&V) was sworn in as Prime Minister. It followed the Belgian general election of 2007 and comprised five parties: the Dutch-speaking Christian Democratic and Flemish (CD&V), the Dutch-speaking Open Flemish Liberals and Democrats (Open VLD), the French-speaking liberal Reformist Movement (MR), the French-speaking Socialist Party (PS) and the French-speaking Humanist Democratic Centre (CDH).

The government received the confidence of the Chamber of Representatives on 22 March 2008, with 97 votes in favour, 48 against, and one abstaining.

It was succeeded by a government led by CD&V member Herman Van Rompuy on 30 December 2008.

Composition
The Leterme I Government comprised 15 ministers and seven secretaries of state. Its final composition was as follows:

Changes
On 19 April 2008,  (PS) resigned as Secretary of State for the Fight against Poverty after a scandal when it became clear a judicial investigation related to his time as an alderman in Namur was being conducted.
On 19 December 2008, Jo Vandeurzen resigned as Deputy Prime Minister and Minister of Justice and Institutional Reforms in the wake of accusations that he and Leterme improperly tried to influence the judgement of the court of appeal regarding the sale of Fortis. Later that day Leterme offered the resignation of his entire government.

Government crises
In the late hours of 14 July 2008, after months of negotiations regarding constitutional reform and the status of the Brussels-Halle-Vilvoorde electoral district failed, and the deadline of 15 July 2008 neared without the hope of a result, Leterme offered the resignation of his cabinet to the king. After a series of consultations, King Albert II decided to reject Prime Minister Leterme's resignation on 17 July. The royal palace said that the King had asked two senior French-speaking politicians, François-Xavier de Donnéa (MR) and Raymond Langendries (CDH), and the Minister-President of the German-speaking Community, Karl-Heinz Lambertz (SP), to establish how to start talks about institutional reform. They were expected to report back to the king by the end of the month. However, on 31 July 2008, they reported that they needed more time for the negotiations.

On 19 December 2008, Yves Leterme offered the resignation of his government to King Albert after a crisis surrounding the sale of Fortis to BNP Paribas erupted. Leterme, Jo Vandeurzen, and Didier Reynders were accused of violating the separation of powers by trying to influence the court of appeal and of exerting improper influence by the First Chairman of the Court of Cassation. Three days later the resignation was accepted by the king.

See also
2007–2011 Belgian political crisis

References

Belgian governments
2008 establishments in Belgium
2008 disestablishments in Belgium
Cabinets established in 2008
Cabinets disestablished in 2008